UNS Energy is the parent company of Tucson Electric Power and UniSource Energy Services.

History
UniSource Energy was started in 1998 as the parent company for Tucson Electric Power. In 2003, the company acquired Citizens Communications's Arizona gas and electric operations in 2003 and renamed them UniSource Energy Services.

On August 24, 2004, the company restated its net income, and the new figure is $113.9 million in 2003, $34.9 million in 2002 and $63.8 million in 2001.

The company changed its name to UNS Energy in 2012.

In 2013, Fortis announced its acquisition of UNS and completed this in August 2014.

References

External links
UniSource Energy 
Tucson Electric Power
UniSource Energy Services
https://www.fortisinc.com/our-companies/uns-energy

Fortis Inc.
Companies formerly listed on the New York Stock Exchange
Electric power companies of the United States
Companies based in Tucson, Arizona